Sosa is a village and a civil parish of the municipality of Vagos, Portugal. The population in 2011 was 3,069, in an area of 22.03 km2.

References

Freguesias of Vagos